Eatoniella caliginosa is a species of minute sea snail, a marine gastropod mollusk in the family Eatoniellidae, the eatoniellids.

Distribution
The species is endemic to the Kerguelen Islands.

Description 
The maximum recorded shell length is 2.24 mm.

Habitat 
Minimum recorded depth is 0 m. Maximum recorded depth is 41 m.

References

External links

Eatoniellidae
Gastropods described in 1875
Fauna of the Kerguelen Islands